The .300 H&H Magnum cartridge was introduced by the British company Holland & Holland as the Super-Thirty in June, 1925. The case was belted like the .375 H&H Magnum, and is based on the same case, as also is the .244 H&H Magnum.  The belt is for headspace as the cases' shoulders have a narrow slope rather than an actual shoulder.  More modern magnums continue this practice, but headspacing on the belt is not necessary with their more sharply angled shoulders.  The cartridge was used by American shooter Ben Comfort to win the 1000-yard Wimbledon Cup Match at Camp Perry in 1935, and it was used again to win the international 1,000 yard competition in 1937.  Winchester chambered the Model 70 in .300 Holland & Holland Magnum in 1937.

The cartridge offered superior ballistics to the .30-06 for long range, and the .300 H&H is almost as versatile with all bullet weights and types, especially if well-developed handloads are used.  It excels with the heaviest .30-calibre bullets in the 180–220-grain range. SAAMI has set the pressure limit for this cartridge at 54,000 P.S.I. Its case length calls for a full-length magnum action, and surplus military actions chambered for the .308 Norma Magnum or the .300 Winchester Magnum offered a lower cost alternative for similar ballistics in the 1960s.  The long .300 H&H case was designed for loading cordite, and those two modern magnum cartridges offered similar powder volume in a shorter case better adapted to ballistic uniformity with United States Improved Military Rifle (IMR) smokeless powder.

It has never been as popular as the .30-06; but the mystique of well-crafted rifles chambered for the .300 H&H keeps the cartridge in use despite its repeatedly reported demise. The .300 H&H is a fine African plains game cartridge, and suitable for all but the most dangerous big game and pachyderms.

As it was common for rimless hunting cartridges, a rimmed (beltless) variant, at the time called just "Holland's Super .30" and now sometimes named .30 Super Flanged H&H, was developed simultaneously for break-barrel rifles and combination guns.

Design & Specifications
The CIP treats the .300 H&H Magnum and the .30 Super Belted Rimless H&H as separate entities and provides separate entries for the cartridges. There are minute but significant variations with regard to dimensions between the two cartridges. While both cartridges are regulated by the CIP only the .300 H&H Magnum's chamber is regulated by the CIP. The CIP does not provide chamber dimensions for the .30 Super.
Although cartridges are generally considered interchangeable, chambers conforming to the strict minimum chamber of the .30 Super may not be able to chamber the .300 H&H Magnum.

Both cartridges are based on .375 H&H Magnum cartridge design which provides an increase in capacity over many other cartridges. They feature tapering bodies and very shallow shoulders which prevent them from headspacing reliably on their shoulders. The belt plays a useful role in these cartridges in that it provides a demarcation point for reliable headspacing of the cartridge.

CIP compliant .300 H&H Magnum schematic diagram

CIP compliant .30 Super schematic diagram

{| class="wikitable" border="1"
|+ Cartridge Dimension and Specification Conflicts Between the .300 H&H Magnum and the .30 Super  
|-
| style="background: #eeeeee" width="200pt" | Dimension / Specification  
| style="background: #eeeeee" width="180pt" | CIP Dimension Index 
| style="background: #eeeeee" width="180pt" | 300 H&H Magnum Value 
| style="background: #eeeeee" width="180pt" | .30 Super Value 
|-
| style="background: #eeeeee" | Base to shoulder length|| L1 ||  ||  
|-
| style="background: #eeeeee" | Base to neck length|| L2 ||  ||  
|-
| style="background: #eeeeee" | Height to belt|| E ||  ||  
|-
| style="background: #eeeeee" | Extractor notch ∅|| E1 ||  ||  
|-
| style="background: #eeeeee" | Extractor notch width|| e min ||  ||  
|-
| style="background: #eeeeee" | ∠ to belt|| δ || 35° || 45°  
|-
| style="background: #eeeeee" | Shoulder ∠|| α || 17° 0’ 9” || 16° 56’ 59” 
|-
| style="background: #eeeeee" | Pressure || Pmax ||  ||  
|}

As the CIP uses the shoulder vertex length as an index to provide correct headspacing for the cartridge, this indicates that the cartridges are dimensionally interchangeable. However, as the .30 Super is rated for a lower pressure, the .300 H&H Magnum cartridge should not be fired in a .30 Super. However, the .30 Super can be discharged in a .300 H&H Magnum rifle. As most significant difference between the cartridges was that the .30 Super was loaded to a far lower pressure than the .300 H&H Magnum.

See also
 .30-06 Springfield
 .300 Winchester Magnum
 .300 Weatherby Magnum
 .300 Winchester Short Magnum
 .300 Remington Short Action Ultra Magnum
 .300 Remington Ultra Magnum
 7 mm caliber
 Table of handgun and rifle cartridges
 Winchester Model 70

References

The .300 Holland & Holland Magnum by Chuck Hawks (subscription req)

External links
 The .300 H&H Magnum by Chuck Hawks

Pistol and rifle cartridges
Holland & Holland cartridges
British firearm cartridges